Denis Abudarovich Fayzullin (born 12 April 2001) is a Russian football player who plays for FC Irtysh Omsk.

Club career
He made his debut in the Russian Football National League for FC Tom Tomsk on 27 February 2021 in a game against FC Alania Vladikavkaz.

On 1 June 2021, he extended his contract with FC Lokomotiv Moscow and was loaned to FC Fakel Voronezh for the 2021–22 season.

References

External links
 
 Profile by Russian Football National League

2001 births
Footballers from Ufa
Living people
Russian footballers
Russia youth international footballers
Association football forwards
FC Lokomotiv Moscow players
FC Tom Tomsk players
FC Fakel Voronezh players
FC Irtysh Omsk players
Russian First League players
Russian Second League players